The 1986 IAAF Grand Prix Final was the second edition of the season-ending competition for the IAAF Grand Prix track and field circuit,  organised by the International Association of Athletics Federations. It was held at the Stadio Olimpico in Rome, Italy on 10 September 1986. Saïd Aouita (5000 metres) and Yordanka Donkova (100 metres hurdles) were the overall points winners of the tournament.

Medal summary

Men

Women

Points leaders

Men

Women

References
IAAF Grand Prix Final. GBR Athletics. Retrieved on 2015-01-17.

External links
IAAF Grand Prix Final archive from IAAF

Grand Prix Final
Grand Prix Final
International athletics competitions hosted by Italy
1986
1980s in Rome
Sports competitions in Rome
September 1986 sports events in Europe
Athletics in Rome